Gideon Sundback (April 24, 1880 – June 21, 1954) was a Swedish-American electrical engineer, who is most commonly associated with his work in the development of the zipper.

Background 
Otto Fredrik Gideon Sundback was born on Sonarp farm in Ödestugu Parish, in Jönköping County, Småland, Sweden. He was the son of Jonas Otto Magnusson Sundback, a prosperous farmer, and his wife Kristina Karolina Klasdotter. After his studies in Sweden, Sundback moved to Germany, where he studied at the polytechnic school in Bingen am Rhein. In 1903, Sundback took his engineer exam. In 1905, he emigrated to the United States.

Career 
In 1905, Gideon Sundback started to work at Westinghouse Electric and Manufacturing Company in Pittsburgh, Pennsylvania. In 1906, Sundback was hired to work for the Universal Fastener Company of Hoboken, New Jersey. Subsequently, in 1909, Sundback was promoted to the position of head designer at Universal Fastener.

Sundback made several advances in the development of the zipper between 1906 and 1914, while working for companies that later evolved into Talon, Inc. He built upon the previous work of other engineers such as Elias Howe, Max Wolff, and Whitcomb L. Judson.

He was responsible for improving the "Judson C-curity Fastener".  At that time the company's product was still based on hooks and eyes. Sundback developed an improved version of the C-curity, called the "Plako", but it too had a strong tendency to pull apart, and was not any more successful than the previous versions. Sundback finally solved the pulling-apart problem in 1913, with his invention of the first version not based on the hook-and-eye principle, the "Hookless Fastener No. 1". He increased the number of fastening elements from four per inch to ten or eleven. His invention had two facing rows of teeth that pulled into a single piece by the slider and increased the opening for the teeth guided by the slider.

The patent for the "Separable Fastener" was issued in 1917. Gideon Sundback also created the manufacturing machine for the new device. The "S-L" or "scrapless" machine took a special Y-shaped wire and cut scoops from it, then punched the scoop dimple and nib, and clamped each scoop on a cloth tape to produce a continuous zipper chain.  Within the first year of operation, Sundback's machinery was producing a few hundred feet (around 100 meters) of fastener per day.

In 1914, Sundback developed a version based on interlocking teeth, the "Hookless No. 2", which was the modern metal zipper in all its essentials. In this fastener each tooth is punched to have a dimple on its bottom and a nib or conical projection on its top. The nib atop one tooth engages in the matching dimple in the bottom of the tooth that follows it on the other side as the two strips of teeth are brought together through the two Y channels of the slider. The teeth are crimped tightly to a strong fabric cord that is the selvage edge of the cloth tape that attaches the zipper to the garment, with the teeth on one side offset by half a tooth's height from those on the other side's tape. They are held so tightly to the cord and tape that once meshed there is not enough play to let them pull apart. A tooth cannot rise up off the nib below it enough to break free, and its nib on top cannot drop out of the dimple in the tooth above it.   for the "Separable Fastener" was issued in 1917.

The name zipper was created in 1923 by B.F. Goodrich, who used the device on their new boots. Initially, boots and tobacco pouches were the primary use for zippers; it took another twenty years before they caught on in the fashion industry. About the time of World War II the zipper achieved wide acceptance for the flies of trousers and the plackets of skirts and dresses.

Sundback also created the manufacturing machine for the new zipper. Lightning Fastener Company, one early manufacturer of the zipper, was based in St. Catharines, Ontario. Although Sundback frequently visited the Canadian factory as president of the company, he resided in Meadville, Pennsylvania and remained an American citizen. Sundback was awarded the Gold Medal of the Royal Swedish Academy of Engineering Sciences in 1951. Sundback died of a heart condition in 1954 and was interred at Greendale Cemetery in Meadville, Pennsylvania.

Personal
On June 5, 1909, Sundback married (Naomi) Elvira Aronson, daughter of the Swedish born plant manager Peter Aron Aronson (Aronsson), in Hoboken, New Jersey.

Legacy
In 2006, Sundback was honored by inclusion in the National Inventors Hall of Fame for his work on the development of the zipper. On April 24, 2012, the 132nd anniversary of Sundback's birth, Google changed the Google logo on its homepage to a Google Doodle of the zipper, which when opened revealed the results of a search for Gideon Sundback.

1917 patent
Sundback's  (filed in 1914, issued in 1917):

References

Other sources
Petroski, Henry (1992) The Evolution of Useful Things (Vintage Books) 
Friedel, Robert (1996) Zipper: An Exploration in Novelty (W. W. Norton and Company)

External links

 An image of US patent no. 1219881

1880 births
1954 deaths
American electrical engineers
People from Jönköping Municipality
Swedish emigrants to the United States
Swedish electrical engineers
20th-century American inventors
Burials at Greendale Cemetery